Oakland is a town in Fayette County, Tennessee, United States. In 2020 the population of the town was 8,936, a gain of 417.8% since 2000, Reasons for this population boom, are the cities/counties low taxes, its low crime rate, and the 4 lane expansion of U.S. Highway  64 in the early 1990s.

Geography and climate
Oakland is located in west-central Fayette County.  U.S. Route 64 is the main highway through town, leading east  to Somerville, the county seat, and west  to downtown Memphis. South 18 miles (29 km) is the Tennessee-Mississippi state line. Tennessee Routes 194 and 196 are north-south state highways in Oakland.

The town limits have expanded north and south of the original town center, and especially to the west along US 64, extending  to nearly reach the Shelby County line.

Climate:

Demographics

2020 census

As of the 2020 United States Census, there were 8,936 people, 3,100 households, and 2,490 families residing in the town.

2000 census
As of the census of 2000, there were 1,279 people, 510 households, and 401 families residing in the town. The racial makeup of the town was 81.47% White, 16.50% African American, 0.31% Native American, 1.02% Asian, 0.47% from other races, and 0.23% from two or more races. Hispanic or Latino of any race were 1.56% of the population.

There were 510 households, out of which 33.9% had children under the age of 18 living with them, 67.8% were married couples living together, 8.2% had a female householder with no husband present, and 21.2% were non-families. 18.6% of all households were made up of individuals, and 3.7% had someone living alone who was 65 years of age or older. The average household size was 2.51 and the average family size was 2.85.

In the town, the population was spread out, with 23.9% under the age of 18, 9.6% from 18 to 24, 37.1% from 25 to 44, 20.8% from 45 to 64, and 8.5% who were 65 years of age or older. The median age was 31 years. For every 100 females, there were 96.8 males. For every 100 females age 18 and over, there were 95.4 males.

The median income for a household in the town was $51,823, and the median income for a family was $56,786. Males had a median income of $35,870 versus $23,929 for females. The per capita income for the town was $19,365. About 4.6% of families and 5.7% of the population were below the poverty line, including 9.3% of those under age 18 and 4.7% of those age 65 or over.

Economy
In June 2007, although much smaller in population than its counterparts, Oakland had the highest number of building permits issued for any suburb in the Memphis metropolitan area, including Southaven and Olive Branch, Mississippi, and Collierville, Tennessee. Retail stores make up most of the commercial business.  Large retail stores located in Oakland, Include Walmart, Kroger,  and Walgreens. RING Container Technologies - a plastic fabrication company - is headquartered in Oakland. Back in the early 20th century, Oakland was home to Tennessees largest egg factory, as well as a large Christmas Tree farm. Oakland has a golf course called, "The Fair Oaks Golf Course" . It has been open since 2000.

Government
In November 2008, Bill Mullins was elected mayor for his fifth term, beating rival Scott Ferguson in a narrow victory; the margin of votes between them just 15.

In July 2009, Mayor Mullins was arrested on charges of official misconduct and concealing evidence.  The following March, a jury found him guilty on three counts of official misconduct.  Prosecutors said Mullins falsified documents to cover up payments made to his own business by the City of Oakland, after he had completed work on city owned vehicles at his privately owned repair shop, but did not document the $2,000 payment.  Mullins was sentenced to one year probation and prohibited from holding any elected or appointed office for 10 years.

In December 2009, the November 2008 election was ruled invalid after 23 people were found to have voted illegally. In a follow-up election in 2010, Scott Ferguson was elected mayor.

In 2013, Mayor Ferguson—a former preacher—resigned from office after it was revealed he had two wives. The Vice-mayor, Chris Goodman, assumed office until 2016.  In 2016 Chris Goodman was elected.  In November 2020, he was defeated by Mike Brown.

Brandon Calloway, 25, was severely beaten by Oakland, Tennessee, police officers on July 16, 2022, following a minor traffic violation.  Oakland Police said Calloway failed to make a complete stop at a stop sign, and was traveling 12 miles over the speed limit. Calloway drove away at high speed, refused to stop for officers, jumped out of his car, and was accompanied by passenger, they both ran into a house, that later turned out to be the home of Calloway's father. The Oakland Police continued chase and entered the home, where to two suspects had run. The Suspects had locked and bolted the door from inside. Several in the community sided with Calloway, as if you run from the Police, during a traffic stop, and get into a house, they felt the police should just leave. The police said Calloway fought and was finally cuffed and taken into custody. There was no gun fire. Most of the citizens of Oakland sided with the Police, as running from the Police, escaping into a house demands some immediate action by the police, as they [the police] had no way of knowing who was in the house, of even if this house belonged to the fleeing criminals!  Video of the arrest shows officers kicking in the door of his father’s home, chasing Calloway through house, hitting him repeatedly with a baton, tazing him and stepping on his neck. Oakland’s Town Manager has reportedly identified one officer who has been suspended during investigation as Officer Richardson.
Fayette County District Attorney Mark Davidson confirmed the Tennessee Bureau of Investigation is investigating the arrest.

References

External links
 Town of Oakland official website
 Oakland Chamber of Commerce
 Fayette County Chamber of Commerce Website

Towns in Fayette County, Tennessee
Towns in Tennessee
Memphis metropolitan area